Chinese culture attaches certain values to colors, like which colors are considered auspicious or inauspicious.  The Chinese word for "color" is yánsè. In Classical Chinese, the character sè more accurately meant "color in the face", or "emotion". It was generally used alone and often implied sexual desire or desirability. During the Tang Dynasty, the word yánsè came to mean all color. A Chinese idiom which is used to describe many colors, Wǔyánliùsè (五顏六色), can also mean colors in general.

Theory of the Five Elements (Wuxing 五行)
In traditional Chinese art and culture, black, red, qing (a conflation of the idea of green and blue), white and yellow are viewed as standard colors.  These colors correspond to the five elements (五行) of water, fire, wood, metal and earth, taught in traditional Chinese physics. Throughout the Shang, Tang, Zhou and Qin dynasties, China's emperors used the Theory of the Five Elements to select colors. Other colors were considered by Confucius as 'inferior'.

Yellow

Yellow of a golden hue is considered the most beautiful and prestigious color. The Chinese conception of yellow (huáng) is inclusive of many shades considered tan or brown in English and the primary association is with the earth rather than the sun. The Chinese saying Yellow generates Yin and Yang implies that yellow is the center of everything. Associated with but ranked above brown, yellow signifies neutrality and good luck. Yellow is sometimes paired with red in place of gold.

The Yellow River is the cradle of Chinese civilisation. Yellow was the emperor's color in Imperial China and is held as the symbolic color of the five legendary emperors of ancient China, such as the Yellow Emperor. The Yellow Dragon is the zoomorphic incarnation of the Yellow Emperor of the centre of the universe in Chinese religion and mythology. The Flag of the Qing dynasty featured golden yellow as the background. The Plain Yellow Banner and the Bordered Yellow Banner were two of the upper three banners of Later Jin and Qing dynasty. 

Yellow often decorates royal palaces, altars and temples, and the color was used in the dragon robes and attire of the emperors. It was a rare honour to receive the imperial yellow jacket. 

Yellow also represents freedom from worldly cares and is thus esteemed in Buddhism. Monks' garments are yellow, as are elements of Buddhist temples.  Yellow is also used as a mourning color for Chinese Buddhists.

Yellow is also symbolic of heroism, as opposed to the Western association of the color with cowardice.

Black

Black (hēi), corresponding to water, is generally understood as a neutral color although appearing in many negative contexts in idioms and common names. "Black help"  hēibāng) is the usual name for Chinese organized crime and the Thick Black Theory of the late Qing intellectual Li Zongwu (1879–1943) is an exhortation to Machiavellianism. In modern China, black is used in clothing, especially in professional contexts. Black has less association with mourning than white in traditional Chinese culture but formal black jackets and slacks have become associated with international professionalism.

The I Ching or Book of Changes regards black as Heaven's color. The saying "heaven and earth are black" was rooted in the observation that the northern sky was black for a long time. Ancient Chinese people believed Tiandi or the Heavenly Emperor resided in the North Star. The Taiji symbol uses black and white or red to represent the unity of yin and yang. Ancient Chinese people regarded black as the king of colors and honored black more consistently than any other color. Laozi said know the white, keep the black and Taoists believe black is the color of the Tao.

White
White (bái) corresponds with metal among the Five Elements and represents gold and symbolises brightness, purity, and fulfilment. Light-colored skin is highly valued by many Chinese, especially in consideration of women as potential brides. White is also the traditional color of mourning, although white wedding gowns have become more popular since the Opening Up Policy.

Red

Red   hóng), vermilion (dān), and crimson (chì) are associated with masculine yang energy and fire, good fortune and joy. Red is the traditional color used during Chinese New Year and other celebrations, including weddings and wedding gowns. Chinese reds are traditionally inclusive of shades English might consider orange or warm brown.

A hongbaoa red envelope stuffed with money, now frequently red 100 RMB notesis the usual gift in Chinese communities for Chinese New Year, birthdays, marriages, bribes, and other special occasions. The red color of the packet symbolizes good luck. Red is strictly forbidden at funerals as it is traditionally symbolic of happiness. The names of the dead were previously written in red, so it is generally somewhat offensive to use red ink for Chinese names in contexts other than official seals.

In the People's Republic of China, red remains a very popular color and is affiliated with and used by the Communist Party and the government.

Blue / Green

Old Chinese did not make a blue-green distinction, having a single "verdant" color (qīng) that covered both. The clear blue sky and fresh green vegetables were considered shades of a single color which could even include black as its darkest hue in some contexts. Modern Standard Mandarin does make the blue-green distinction using lǜ   "leafy") for green and lán   "indigo") for blue. 

Qīng was associated with health, prosperity, and harmony. It was used for the roof tiles and ornate interior of the Temple of Heaven and in other structures to represent heaven. It is also the color of most jade as well as the greenware pottery that was developed to imitate it. 

Separately, green hats are associated with infidelity and used as an idiom for a cuckold. This has caused uneasiness for Chinese Catholic bishops, who, in ecclesiastical heraldry, would normally have a green hat above their arms. Chinese bishops have compromised by using a violet hat for their coat of arms.

Intermediary colors
The five intermediary colors are formed as combinations of the five elemental colors. These are:

   "green": The intermediary color of the east, combination of central yellow and eastern blue
   "emerald-blue": The intermediary color of the west, combination of eastern blue and western white
   "light-red": The intermediary color of the south, combination of western white and southern red
   "violet": The intermediary color of the north, combination of southern red and northern black
   "horse-brown": The intermediary color of the center, combination of northern black and central yellow

See also
 Chinese art
 Culture of China
 Culture of the People's Republic of China
 Fashion of China
 Luck
 Numbers in Chinese culture
 Jing (Chinese opera)#Face design for information on color in Chinese opera face paintings
 Wuxing
 Four Symbols
 Wufang Shangdi

References

Chinese culture
Color in culture
Wu Xing